The 2017 season was the Los Angeles Chargers' 48th in the National Football League (NFL), their 58th overall, their second in the Greater Los Angeles Area and their first under head coach Anthony Lynn. It was the Chargers' first season in Los Angeles since their inaugural 1960 season, when they were in the AFL, as the team exercised its option to move back to the city and join the Los Angeles Rams on January 12, 2017. The 2017 season was the first of three seasons played at StubHub Center prior to the new stadium in Inglewood being completed in 2020.

The Chargers, despite an 0–4 start, finished the season with 9–7 record and improved their 5–11 record from last season after a week 13 win over the Cleveland Browns. Their season finale win over the Raiders helped the Chargers finish with a winning record for the first time since 2014. However, they missed the playoffs for the fourth consecutive season — the Chargers finished in a four-way tie with the Tennessee Titans, Buffalo Bills and Baltimore Ravens for the two Wild Card playoff spots, but the Titans and Bills claimed the Wild Cards based on tiebreakers.

Offseason

Transition to Los Angeles
On January 2, 2017, Chargers' head coach Mike McCoy was fired along with the majority of his coaching staff. On January 12, 2017, Chargers' owner Dean Spanos announced during a press conference the decision to immediately return the San Diego Chargers to Los Angeles. Spanos had a deadline of January 17, 2017, to decide if he wanted to return the team to Los Angeles. The Chargers were chosen by the league in 2016 as the second team to be allowed to relocate to Los Angeles with the Los Angeles Rams and play at SoFi Stadium in Inglewood, California. Until the new stadium was compleated in 2020, the Chargers played the 2017, 2018, and 2019 seasons at the StubHub Center in Carson, California.

The Chargers transitioned from San Diego to new headquarters in the Los Angeles area throughout the offseason, although social and fan reaction was overwhelmingly negative. The team held their mini-camp in San Diego, with the final day on the field at the old practice field coming on June 15. Former players James Lofton, Nick Hardwick and Jacques Cesaire showed up on the final day, as did fans.

Trucks moved equipment up the road after the final practice. Front office people continued to work in San Diego until the team's lease expired later in the summer then the team completely moved to their new headquarters in Costa Mesa, California.

Signings

Releases

Draft

Staff

Final roster

Preseason

Regular season

Schedule

Note: Intra-division opponents are in bold text.

Game summaries

Week 1: at Denver Broncos

Rookie kicker Younghoe Koo's game-tying 44-yard field goal attempt in the final seconds was blocked by the Denver's Shelby Harris, and the Chargers lost 24–21. An earlier attempt by Koo was successful, but it was called off after the Broncos had called a timeout right before the snap.

Week 2: vs. Miami Dolphins

In their first Game back In Los Angeles since 1960 Koo missed a game-winning 44-yard field goal attempt as time expired in a 19–17 loss to Miami.

Week 3: vs. Kansas City Chiefs

Week 4: vs. Philadelphia Eagles

The Chargers play a home game at StubHub Center against the NFC East's Philadelphia Eagles. Notably, this home game turned out to be a 'road game' for the Chargers as Eagles fans took over StubHub and turned it into, as dubbed on Twitter, "Lincoln Financial Field West". In the end the Eagles won 26-24 over the Chargers.

With the loss, the Chargers' record dropped to 0-4, last place in the AFC West.

Week 5: at New York Giants

In a back-and-forth game against the Giants, the Chargers proved victorious after rallying to score 10 unanswered points to retake the lead. Four plays after Giants star receiver Odell Beckham Jr. suffered a season-ending broken ankle, Philip Rivers delivered a 10-yard touchdown pass to Melvin Gordon with just under three minutes to go, and the Los Angeles defense prevented New York from responding. With the win, the Chargers earned their first win of the season, also snapping a 9-game losing streak that dated back to their previous season in San Diego.

Week 6: at Oakland Raiders

Week 7: vs. Denver Broncos

With their first home victory as the L.A. Chargers, Philip Rivers went 15/26 for 183 passing yard and 2 touchdowns, shutting out the Denver Broncos. It was their first home win in Los Angeles since December 18, 1960.

Week 8: at New England Patriots

Week 10: at Jacksonville Jaguars

Week 11: vs. Buffalo Bills

The Chargers handily routed the Bills, partly thanks to Buffalo's now-infamous decision to start rookie quarterback Nathan Peterman, who threw five interceptions to the Chargers defense in the first half alone before being pulled for previous starter Tyrod Taylor. With the win, Los Angeles snapped its 2-game losing streak to improve to 4–6.

Week 12: at Dallas Cowboys
NFL on Thanksgiving Day
 
Philip Rivers threw three touchdowns in the second half, and Dak Prescott threw two interceptions in the fourth quarter, one of which was returned 90 yards by rookie Desmond King for a touchdown, for a second straight win. With the win and the Chiefs losing on Sunday, the Chargers ended up one game out of first in the AFC West. This would be the first time since 2010 that the Chargers would wear the alternate powder blue jerseys introduced in 2007 against an NFC team and the first time ever it was worn on the road.

Week 13: vs. Cleveland Browns

The Chargers, for the second straight year in a row, faced a winless Browns team. Former Browns kicker Travis Coons, signed off the Chargers' practice squad in place of an injured Nick Novak, kicked four field goals in the game. Keenan Allen caught a touchdown, and the defense forced two fourth-quarter turnovers to seal the game. With the win, along with the Chiefs' loss to the Jets earlier and the Raiders beating the Giants, the Chargers moved into a three-way tie for first place in the AFC West.

Week 14: vs. Washington Redskins

Week 15: at Kansas City Chiefs

Week 16: at New York Jets

Week 17: vs. Oakland Raiders

Standings

Division

Conference

References

External links
 

Los Angeles Chargers
Los Angeles Chargers seasons
Los Angeles Chargers